Fatiah Kanyinsola Ojediran (born August 26, 2008) is a Nigerian singer and songwriter, professionally known as Phatiah, Phatiah music.

Education
She was born as Fatiah Kayinsola Ojediran on August 26, 2008, in Lagos State, Nigeria. She attended Starfield group of schools in Lagos for her primary and Junior secondary Education, and she went further to Ifako International Schools to continue her Senior Secondary Education.

Career
At the age of five, Fatiah showed a keen interest in music and took it a step further in rhyming popular music lyrics, just as she declared her interest to become a musician who will influence people positively with her music.

Having expressed her desire, her parents set about providing the enabling environment for her to express her inmate talents for public consumption. She was mentored and tutored by her father a Nigerian Music entrepreneur and was signed under his management company Climax Entertainment in 2019.

She gained an audience when she decided to innovate and promote conscious pop music in Nigeria.

She made a passionate plea to the government to provide adequate care for children who she says are the future in her song “Leaders of Tomorrow” with the aim of drawing the attention of the public and humanity to the plight of children in a way that meets the objectives of UNICEF.

In an interview with the BBC What's New team, Phatiah insisted she is still very motivated by Social Change despite facing challenges from friends, well wishers and family but remains steadfast because of the love and support she gets which motivates her drive for her music.

She launched her international performance with stunning one at the “A Thousand Hill Festival” in Rwanda

Discography 
In August 2018, track titled “Education” which was released on the stables of Climax Entertainments in August 2018. Her works are:
 Education (2018)
 Leaders of Tomorrow (2020)* 
 JEJE featuring Destiny Boy (2021)* 

She is not resting on her oars as she is set to go above the sky with eagle-like precision by producing music with wholesome, inspiring and life-building content.

Professional life
Awards, Nominations and Recognition
 Enya Kid Artiste of the year 2019
 Arise O Nigeria Most Outstanding Kid in Philanthropy of the Year 2018
 Cool Wealth Kid Artiste of the Year Awards 2019
 Enya award Kid Entertainer Year 2020

References 

Nigerian women musicians
Yoruba women musicians
Singers from Lagos
Nigerian women pop singers
Nigerian women singer-songwriters
Nigerian singer-songwriters
Nigerian soul singers
Living people
2008 births